Appikonda is a neighborhood situated on the southern part of Visakhapatnam City, India,and is about 30 km from the Visakhapatnam . Appikonda is known for the Someswara Swamy Temple.

References

Neighbourhoods in Visakhapatnam